Brasher Falls is the largest hamlet and a census-designated place (CDP) in the town of Brasher in St. Lawrence County, New York, United States. As of the 2010 census, it had a population of 669.

The community is in northeastern St. Lawrence County, in the southwestern corner of the town of Brasher. It is bordered to the west by Winthrop in the town of Stockholm, and to the south by the town of Lawrence. It sits on both sides of the St. Regis River, which drops  in elevation through the hamlet, on its way north to join the St. Lawrence River in Quebec, Canada.

The Dr. Buck–Stevens House, an octagon house listed on the National Register of Historic Places, is on West Main Street in the hamlet.

Demographics

References 

Census-designated places in St. Lawrence County, New York
Census-designated places in New York (state)